Halgerda okinawa is a species of sea slug, a dorid nudibranch, shell-less marine gastropod mollusks in the family Discodorididae.

Distribution 
This species was described from Seragaki, Okinawa. It is also reported from Sulawesi and Alor Island, Indonesia, East Timor and the Philippines.

References

Discodorididae
Gastropods described in 2000